Dave "Rave" DesRoches is a Canadian rock musician from Hamilton, Ontario.

To the general public, he is the sometime Teenage Head rhythm guitarist on the early recordings who graduated to lead singer during a Frankie Venom hiatus in 1985 and catapulted the band back into the charts. Many know him as a session player who has played with such notables as Daniel Lanois, Andrew Loog Oldham and Alex Chilton.

Career

Early career 
Dave began his music career in his high school years writing songs and performing driving acoustic rock and folk-pop in and around Hamilton. This evolved into the group, The Shakers, from 1979 to 1982 with Rick Andrew, Tim Gibbons and Claude DesRoches. They charted many singles with albums produced by Daniel Lanois (U2) and Jack Richardson (Guess Who, Alice Cooper).

Teenage Head 
Three years after the break-up of The Shakers in 1982, Dave took over as lead singer of the punk rock band Teenage Head. He had grown up with the members of the band and had played as a backing musician on their "Frantic City" LP, and "The Shakers" had often opened for their fellow Hamiltonians. Dave replaced Frankie Venom who had worked with Dave on several other projects. He continued to aid Teenage Head with hits like "Can’t Stop Shakin’". Dave left Teenage Head after a successful run to try things out on his own. In November 2016, Teenage Head announced the return of Dave "Rave" Desroches as lead singer.

The Dave Rave Conspiracy 
Alongside producer Gary Pig Gold he formed a group called "The Dave Rave Conspiracy", releasing the album "Valentino's Pirates" on Russia’s Melodiya record label in 1992. However, to appease cold war era Russian sensibilities, the album was credited to the Dave Rave "Group", as the label was uncomfortable with the word "conspiracy". Notably, the band also included Billy Ficca, formerly of the influential New York City band Television, and Lauren Agnelli, of the 1980s anti-folk band Washington Squares. "Valentino's Pirates" has become a quite a cult classic, and was the first North American rock album released by a post-Soviet state after the fall of the Berlin Wall. Press surrounding this release included a CBC documentary revisiting Russia with the group as well as 3 promotional videos that were in heavy rotation at MuchMusic in Canada. Bullseye Records re-issued the album for the first time on CD in 2001.

The next Dave Rave Conspiracy album, Three Octave Fantastic Hexagram, was released in 1994 and included many of the players from the Valentino’s album along with former Washington Squares, Lauren Agnelli. However, the band broke up shortly afterward. Agnelli and Dave Rave formed an incredible creative partnership that resulted in 3 Agnelli & Rave albums over the next ten years including the critically acclaimed Cowboy Flowers Sessions, Heaven and Earth, and Confetti.

The Dave Rave Group’s second album, Everyday Magic, was released in 2003 and featured players from his former bands such as Teenage Head, The Shakers and bands and musicians with whom he had worked as either a musician as a producer such as The Trews, Joe Mannix and Kate Schrock. "Love Fades" and the title track "Everyday Magic" featuring ECMA winners and Juno nominees, The Trews, received airplay at Rock, AC and Campus radio. Dave also co-wrote The Trews' single, "I Can’t Say" with Jack Richardson. Other co-writing credits include bands such as Oliver Black, now Townline, and the Maddhatters and he continues to work with and mentor some of the hottest acts today.

Dave spends his time in Canada and the US playing live, producing, writing and coming up with more ideas to bring great musicians together. Dave Rave released his Anthology in two volumes worldwide on Bullseye Records in January 2006. He has also released his second jazz-pop album, "In The Blue of My Dreams", with Mark McCarron in 2007 under the Bongobeat label. It was shortlisted for a Grammy that year. He spent 2008 writing, producing and touring the globe.

Dave Rave spent 2009 playing over 100 shows, including Grey Cup 2009 and three European tours and he had a chance to work again with the Trews on the song "How’s Everything" on their Top 10 DVD. He also had time to record the album, "Live with What You Know", which was released in June 2010 on the Bongo Beat label. Players on the album include members of The Trews, Plastic Heroes, Rick Andrew (The Shakers), Sonic Blue Sound Review, Mark McCarron, The Maddhatters, Gary Pig Gold and the debut of vocalist Kate MacDonald on "Silver Lines" among many other great musicians. Dave has already toured Europe twice in 2010 with one more European tour to go along with a tour of North America in support of the new record.

Discography

Studio albums
 1981 - The Shakers / In Time
 1983 - The Shakers / Weekend 
 1990 - The Dave Rave Group / Valentino's Pirates
 1994 - The Dave Rave Conspiracy / Three Octave Fantastic Hexagram

EPs
 1990 – Dave Rave / Pure Honey

Compilation appearances
 1998 - "Love Of Money (Stupid Cupidity)" - Lauren Agnelli And Dave Rave / Somewhere Down The Road
 2001 - "Xmas Wish List" - Dave Rave Xmas Spirits /  Takin' Care of Christmas
 2003 - "Love Fades" - The Dave Rave Group / International Pop Overthrow Vol. 6
 2011 - "Your Sparks Fly" - Dave Rave / International Pop Overthrow Vol. 14
 2012 - "You're My Sensation" - Dave Rave / International Pop Overthrow Vol. 15
 2013 - "Rockin' to the Middle" - Dave Rave with Rick Andrew / International Pop Overthrow Vol. 16
 2016 - "So Invisible" - Hailee Rose, Dave Rave / International Pop Overthrow Vol. 19

Writing credits
 1985 - Teenage Head / Trouble in the Jungle
 2005 - The Trews / Den of Thieves
 2008 - Teenage Head with Marky Ramone / Teenage Head with Marky Ramone
 2008 - The Black Tales / The Black Tales
 2009 - The Trews / Acoustic – Friends & Total Strangers

As producer
 1985 - Teenage Head / Trouble in the Jungle
 1985 - Teenage Head  / Frantic Romantic single

References

External Links
 

Year of birth missing (living people)
Living people
Canadian male singers
Canadian rock singers
Canadian songwriters
Musicians from Hamilton, Ontario
Writers from Hamilton, Ontario
Teenage Head (band) members